Jean Margaret Laurence  (née Wemyss; July 18, 1926 – January 5, 1987) was a Canadian novelist and short story writer, and is one of the major figures in Canadian literature. She was also a founder of the Writers' Trust of Canada, a non-profit literary organization that seeks to encourage Canada's writing community.

Biography

Early years 
Margaret Laurence was born Jean Margaret Wemyss on 18 July 1926 in Neepawa, Manitoba, the daughter of solicitor Robert Wemyss and Verna Jean Simpson. She was known as "Peggy" during her childhood. Her mother died when she was four, after which a maternal aunt, Margaret Simpson, came to take care of the family. A year later Margaret Simpson married Robert Wemyss, and in 1933 they adopted a son, Robert. In 1935, when Laurence was nine, Robert Wemyss Sr. died of pneumonia. Laurence then moved into her maternal grandfather's home with her stepmother and brother. She lived in Neepawa until she was 18.

Education 
In 1944, Laurence attended Winnipeg's United College, an arts and theology college associated with the University of Manitoba, that would later become the University of Winnipeg. Before attending, she applied for academic scholarships that were granted based on her academic record and financial need. During her first year at United College, Laurence studied in a liberal arts program which included courses in English, History, Ethics, and Psychology. Laurence's interest in English literature was present even in high school, and her interest in writing her own works continued into her formal education. Within the first few weeks of attending the college, Laurence had works of poetry published in the University of Manitoba's publication The Manitoban. She submitted this work under the pseudonym "Steve Lancaster", in what she later credits as a reference to the Lancaster bomber, a highly powerful and successful bomber of the Second World War. Another of Laurence's achievements during her first year of college was being welcomed into the English Club, an organization of senior students who discussed poetry, led by professor Arthur L. Phelps. This was her first time being around peers who were also passionate about literature, and it was an opportunity for her to expand her knowledge as both scholar and writer. "Tony's", a part-cafeteria, part-coffee shop in the basement of United College, was another important place for Laurence to share her literary interests with colleagues. She would meet with friends and discuss literature; those who were writers would share their works with the group. Laurence's years in college not only shaped her from an academic perspective, they also provided opportunities for her to develop creatively and professionally.

During this period Laurence became associated with the Christian socialist movement known as the Social Gospel, which would remain important to her for the remainder of her life. In her senior year of college, Laurence had an increasing number of responsibilities while also continuing to have her own work printed in local publications. She became an associate editor of Vox, United College's literary journal, and was also the publicity president of the Student Council. These opportunities encouraged Laurence to hone her craft of writing, while also giving her the tools to work in journalism—as she would do upon graduation. She showed promise and success in her early literary pursuits. During her undergraduate years, Laurence had at least eighteen poems, three short stories, and a critical essay published.

Laurence graduated with a Bachelor of Arts in English Literature in 1947.

Personal and later life 
Following her graduation from United College, Laurence worked at a leftist weekly newspaper, The Westerner, and then at a new independent newspaper, the Winnipeg Citizen. In her reporting, she covered numerous social and political issues; she also wrote a radio column and reviewed books. Also not long after graduating, she married Jack Fergus Laurence, an engineer. His work took them to England (1949), the then-British protectorate of British Somaliland (1950–1952), as well as the British colony of the Gold Coast (1952–1957).

Laurence developed an admiration for Africa and its various populations, which found expression in her writing. Laurence was so moved by the oral literature of Somalia that she began recording and translating poetry and folk tales, which would later be compiled into the work A Tree for Poverty|A Tree for Poverty: Somali Poetry and Prose (1954). The two-year experience of witnessing attempts to drill wells in  Somalia's desert, and observing the social lives of both ex-pats and Somalis, would later be documented in her 1963 memoir, The Prophet's Camel Bell.

In 1952, Laurence gave birth to daughter Jocelyn during a leave in England. Son David was born in 1955 in the Gold Coast. The family left the Gold Coast just before it gained independence as Ghana in 1957, moving to Vancouver, British Columbia, where they stayed for five years.

In 1962, she separated from her husband and moved to London, England for a year. She then moved to Elm Cottage (Penn, Buckinghamshire) where she lived for more than ten years, although she visited Canada often. Her divorce became final in 1969. That year, she became writer-in-residence at the University of Toronto. A few years later, she moved to Lakefield, Ontario. She also bought a cabin on the Otonabee River near Peterborough, where she wrote The Diviners (1974) during the summers of 1971 to 1973. In 1978, she was the subject of a National Film Board of Canada documentary, Margaret Laurence: First Lady of Manawaka. Laurence served as Chancellor of Trent University in Peterborough from 1981 to 1983.

Death 
In 1986, Laurence was diagnosed with lung cancer late in the disease's development. According to the James King biography, The Life of Margaret Laurence, the prognosis was grave, and as the cancer had spread to other organs, there was no treatment offered beyond palliative care. Laurence decided the best course of action was to spare herself and her family further suffering. She committed suicide at her home at 8 Regent St., Lakefield, on January 5, 1987, by taking a drug overdose, documenting her decision in writing up to the time of her death. She was buried in her hometown in the Neepawa Cemetery, Neepawa, Manitoba. Laurence's house in Neepawa has been turned into a museum. Her literary papers are housed in the Clara Thomas Archives at York University in Toronto and at McMaster University's William Ready Division of Archives and Research Collections in Hamilton.

Literary career 
One of Canada's most esteemed and beloved authors by the end of her literary career, Laurence began writing short stories in her teenage years while in Neepawa. Her first published piece "The Land of Our Father" was submitted to a competition held by the Winnipeg Free Press. This story contains the first appearance of the name "Manawaka" (a fictional Canadian town used in many of her later works). Shortly after her marriage, Margaret began to write more prolifically, as did her husband. Each published fiction in literary periodicals while living in Africa, but Margaret continued to write and expand her range. Her early novels were influenced by her experience as a minority in Africa. They show a strong sense of Christian symbolism and ethical concern for being a white person in a colonial state.

It was after her return to Canada that she wrote The Stone Angel (1964), the novel for which she is best known. Set in a fictional Manitoba small town called Manawaka, the story is narrated by ninety-year-old Hagar Shipley, alternating between her present moments and recollections of her entire life. The novel was for a time required reading in many North American school systems and colleges. Laurence went on to write four more works of fiction set in Manawaka. Laurence was published by the Canadian publishing company McClelland and Stewart, and she became one of the key figures in the emerging Canadian literature tradition.

Rachel, Rachel is a 1968 film directed by Paul Newman, based on Laurence's novel A Jest of God. The Stone Angel, a feature-length film based on Laurence's novel, written and directed by Kari Skogland and starring Ellen Burstyn premiered in the fall of 2007.

Awards and recognition 
Laurence won two Governor General's Awards for her novels A Jest of God (1966) and The Diviners (1974). In 1972 she was invested as a Companion of the Order of Canada.

The Margaret Laurence Memorial Lecture is an annual lecture series organized by the Writers' Trust of Canada.

The Stone Angel was one of the selected books in the 2002 edition of Canada Reads, championed by Leon Rooke.

The University of Winnipeg named a Women's Studies Centre, and an annual speaker series, in Laurence's honour.

At York University in Toronto, one of the undergraduate residence buildings (Bethune Residence) named a floor after her.

In 2016, she was named a National Historic Person.

Bibliography

Novels
 This Side Jordan (1960)
 The Stone Angel (1964)
 A Jest of God (1966) 
 The Fire-Dwellers (1969)
 The Diviners (1974)
 The Loons

Short story collections
 The Tomorrow-Tamer (1963)
 A Bird in the House (1970)

Children's books
 Jason's Quest (1970)
 Six Darn Cows (1979)
 The Olden Days Coat (1980)
 The Christmas Birthday Story (1982)

Non-fiction
 A Tree for Poverty (1954) — anthology of Somali poetry and folk stories
 The Prophet's Camel Bell (1963) — non-fiction account of Laurence's life in British Somaliland
 Long Drums and Cannons: Nigerian Dramatists and Novelists 1952-1966 (1968)
 Heart of a Stranger (1976) — essays
 Dance on the Earth: A Memoir (1989)

Notes

References 
 King, James. The Life of Margaret Laurence. Toronto: Vintage Canada, 1998. .
 Powers, Lyall. Alien Heart: The Life and Work of Margaret Laurence. East Lansing: Michigan State University Press, 2004. .
 New, W. H., ed. Margaret Laurence: the Writer and Her Critics (1977)
 Thomas, Clara. Margaret Laurence (1969)
 Thomas, Clara. The Manawaka World of Margaret Laurence (1975)
 Woodcock, George, ed. A Place To Stand On: Essays By and About Margaret Laurence (1983)
 Mujahid, Syed:Feminism in Margaret Laurence's 'The Stone Angel', Synthesis:Indian Journal of English  Literature & Language, Vol. 2. No. 2pp. 95–101
 Gupta, Rashmi:Social Taboo of Patriarchal Society:A reading of Margaret Laurence's A Jest of God.Synthesis:Indian Journal of English  Literature & Language, Vol. 2. No. 2 pp. 102–106
 Shiny, V.S.:Sundogs-A post-colonial Protest and Affirmation of the Native Canadian Consciousness.Synthesis:Indian Journal of English  Literature & Language, Vol. 2. No. 2 pp. 102–107

External links 
 Margaret Laurence at The Canadian Encyclopedia
 Biography (York University)
 Margaret Laurence archives at the Clara Thomas Archives and Special Collections, York University Libraries, Toronto, Ontario
 Archival description (McMaster University)
 CBC Digital Archives: Margaret Laurence: Canada's Divine Writer
 University of Winnipeg's Margaret Laurence Women's Studies Centre
 
 Margaret Laurence Home, Neepawa
 Margaret Laurence: Critical Reflections  from the University of Ottawa Press
 A film biography and interview

1926 births
1987 deaths
1987 suicides
Canadian women novelists
Chancellors of Trent University
Companions of the Order of Canada
Members of the United Church of Canada
Suicides by poison
University of Winnipeg alumni
Governor General's Award-winning fiction writers
Writers from Manitoba
People from Neepawa, Manitoba
Canadian expatriates in Somalia
Canadian expatriates in Ghana
Canadian women short story writers
Canadian women children's writers
Canadian children's writers
Persons of National Historic Significance (Canada)
20th-century Canadian novelists
20th-century Canadian women writers
20th-century Canadian short story writers

Writers about Africa